In chemistry, the term amide ( or  or ) is a compound with the functional group RnE(=O)xNR2, where n and x may be 1 or 2, E is some element, and each R represents an organic group or hydrogen. It is a derivative of an oxoacid RnE(=O)xOH with an hydroxy group –OH replaced by an amine group –NR2.

Some important subclasses are 

 carboxamides, or organic amides, where E = carbon, with the general formula RC(=O)NR2.  
 phosphoramides, where E = phosphorus, such as R2P(=O)NR2
 sulfonamides, where E = sulfur, namely RS(=O)2NR2

The term amide may also refer to 
 amide group, a functional group –C(=O)N= consisting of a carbonyl adjacent to a nitrogen atom.
 cyclic amide or lactam, a cyclic compound with the amide group –C(=O)N– in the ring.
 metal amide, an ionic compound ("salt") with the azanide anion H2N− (the conjugate base of ammonia) or to a derivative thereof R2N−.

There is also a neutral amino radical (•NH2) and a positively charged NH2+ ion called a nitrenium ion, but both of these are very unstable.

See also
 Imide

References